Southall is a railway station on the Great Western Main Line in Southall, London, England.

The station is managed by Transport for London, and was rebuilt with step-free access as part of the Crossrail project.

History

The Great Western Railway opened Southall railway station on 1 May 1839, nearly one year after it opened its first railway line on 4 June 1838, between London Paddington and Maidenhead Riverside (the latter now known as Taplow). The Brentford Branch Line to Brentford Dock was opened for freight in 1859; a passenger service ran on the branch from 1 May 1860 until 4 May 1942, using the unnumbered platform at the south of the station (the line serving this platform is now only used as a relief line). The goods platforms  opened as part of the original station were closed and dismantled in 1967. The Great Western Main Line was electrified through Southall in the early 1990s as part of the Heathrow Express project.

Crossrail 
Southall was first proposed to be part of the Crossrail project in the 1990s. In 2004, public consultation into the project proposed a new station building with step free access, as well as platform extensions to serve longer trains. The number of seats available into Central London would treble, due to longer and more frequent trains.

In March 2010, the Crossrail Specialist Scrutiny Panel recommended that Crossrail should give consideration to the proposed regeneration developments in the area, including the Southall Gas Works development and the landscaping of unused work sites.

In May 2011, Network Rail announced that it would deliver improvements and alterations to prepare the station for Crossrail services. The work would include platform extensions, a new ticket hall designed by Bennetts Associates with level access from South Road, and step-free access to all platforms. Outside the station, public realm improvements funded by Transport for London and Ealing Borough Council would include widened pavements, street trees and cycle parking.

In 2015, Ealing Council approved the proposed work at Southall, allowing initial construction work to commence. In 2017, it was announced that completion of the station was delayed until 2019. In 2019, contracts for the new station building was awarded, allowing construction of the new station building. Following delays due to the COVID-19 pandemic, the refurbished station opened on 26 August 2021, providing step free access to all platforms.

Accidents and incidents

The train driver, Larry Harrison, was charged with manslaughter, but the case against him was dropped. Great Western Trains was fined £1.5 million for the crash. Following this accident and the more serious Ladbroke Grove Rail Crash some miles east, First Great Western requires all its trains to have their ATP switched on at all times. If the equipment is faulty, the train is stored out of use.

Bilingual signage 

Southall station has bilingual station signage, owing to the large Punjabi community in the local area. Station signs on the platforms bear "Southall" and also "ਸਾਊਥਹਾਲ" in Gurmukhī, a script commonly used for the Punjabi language. In 2007, following issues raised by other ethnic groups in the area, First Great Western announced it would review the signage. The bilingual signs were kept, and were still displayed at the station. In 2021, the new station building and platform roundel maintained the use of bilingual signage. It is one of the relatively few stations in England to have bilingual signage, others being Whitechapel (Bengali), Wallsend (Latin), Hereford (Welsh), Moreton-in-Marsh (Japanese) and St Pancras International, Ebbsfleet International and Ashford International (all French).

Layout and facilities
Southall railway station has five platforms, one of which is unnumbered and used only for freight and special events. In normal circumstances, platforms 1 and 2, on the fast lines, and the unnumbered platform are not used by passengers; platforms 3 and 4 are used by all trains serving the station. The new station building has a ticket office and automatic ticket barriers. A footbridge gives access to platforms 3 and 4 via steps and lifts, while gates prevents access to the other three, under normal circumstances.

Oyster "pay as you go" has been available since October 2008 for journeys to or from Southall.

Services
Trains at Southall are operated by the Elizabeth line.

Frequency

The Monday-Saturday off-peak service is:
 6tph to Abbey Wood
 2tph to 
 2tph to Heathrow Terminal 4
 2tph to Heathrow Terminal 5

The Sunday service is:
 6 tph to Abbey Wood
 2tph to 
 2tph to Heathrow Terminal 4
 2tph to Heathrow Terminal 5
From May 2023 Elizabeth line trains will also travel to Shenfield.

Service table

Connections

London Buses routes 105, 120, 195, 427, 482, E5 and H32 serve the station.

See also
 Southall Railway Centre–a heritage railway centre, based in part of the former Southall locomotive depot (visible from the station: to the south of the main line, looking towards Paddington). It is home to the GWR Preservation Group.
 Southall East Junction

References

 Baker, T.F.T., Cockburn, J.S. and Pugh, R.B. (Eds) (1971) "Norwood, including Southall: Introduction", A History of the County of Middlesex: Volume 4: Harmondsworth, Hayes, Norwood with Southall, Hillingdon with Uxbridge, Ickenham, Northolt, Perivale, Ruislip, Edgware, Harrow with Pinner, Victoria County History online, p. 40-43, accessed 20 October 2007
 Mitchell V. and Smith, K. (2000) "2. Brentford Branch, Southall", In: Branch Lines of West London, Midhurst : Middleton Press, p. 16-23

External links

Railway stations in the London Borough of Ealing
Railway stations in Great Britain opened in 1839
Great Western Main Line
Former Great Western Railway stations
Railway stations served by the Elizabeth line
Railway stations
1839 establishments in England